The National Science Summer School Inc. is the council that reviews and appoints staff that run the National Youth Science Forum (NYSF).  It is a non-profit organisation charged with overseeing the operation of the National Youth Science Forum in Australia

See also
National Youth Science Forum
Prof Rod Jory

External links
official NSSS Inc website

Educational organisations based in Australia
Summer schools